Beth Gibbons (born 4 January 1965) is an English singer and songwriter. She is the singer and lyricist for the band Portishead, which has released three albums. She released an album with Rustin Man, Out of Season, in 2002, followed by an album with the Polish National Radio Symphony Orchestra in 2019.

Early life
Gibbons was born in Exeter, Devon, England and raised on a farm with three sisters. Her parents divorced when she was young. At 22, she moved to Bath, then Bristol to pursue her singing career, where she met Geoff Barrow, her future collaborator in Portishead.

Career
With Adrian Utley, Gibbons and Barrow released the first Portishead album Dummy in 1994 and have produced two other studio albums, a live album, and various singles in the years since.

She has also collaborated on a separate project with former Talk Talk bassist Paul Webb (Rustin Man). Before she joined Geoff Barrow in Portishead, she had auditioned for the singer's slot in .O.rang, the group formed by Webb after Talk Talk's late-Eighties departure from EMI, but Portishead's sudden success pre-empted matters. In October 2002, they released the album Out of Season in the United Kingdom under the name Beth Gibbons and Rustin Man. The album peaked at number 28 in the UK Albums Chart. It was released in the United States a year later: while touring in North America, Variety favourably described her performance with Rustin as "Billie Holiday fronting Siouxsie and the Banshees".

Gibbons was also a judge for the 10th annual Independent Music Awards to support independent artists' careers.

In June 2013, Gibbons announced plans for a new solo album with Domino Records. She contributed vocals to a cover of the song "Black Sabbath" with the British metal band Gonga, released on 24 April 2014.

In 2018, Gibbons contributed vocal performances, along with Elizabeth Fraser of the Cocteau Twins, to the Spill Festival held in Ipswich in an audio installation entitled 'Clarion Calls', which uses the voices of 100 women to commemorate the 100th anniversary of the end of World War I.

In 2014, Gibbons performed Symphony No. 3 by Henryk Górecki with the Polish National Radio Symphony Orchestra, conducted by Krzysztof Penderecki. Gibbons sang in Polish. The performance was released in 2019; reviewing the album for Pitchfork, Jayson Greene wrote: "Part of the tension comes from hearing her untrained voice scale these rocky heights. Her vibrato, tight and trilling and barely controlled, sounds an awful lot like someone fighting off a panic attack. This would get her dismissed from a traditional opera audition, probably, but it is magnificently effective at sending raw shudders through what can be a pretty well-worn work." In 2022, Gibbons featured on the track "Mother I Sober" from Kendrick Lamar's album Mr. Morale & the Big Steppers. For her collaboration in the album she received a nomination for Album of the Year at the 65th Annual Grammy Awards as a featured artist and songwriter.

Style and inspiration
She has cited Nina Simone, Bono of U2 for his performance on The Joshua Tree, Otis Redding and Jimmy Cliff as a musical inspiration. She has covered Janis Joplin songs and enjoys the music of Janis Ian.

Discography

Portishead
Dummy (1994)
Portishead (1997)
Roseland NYC Live (1998)
Third (2008)

Solo
Out of Season (2002) with Rustin Man
Henryk Górecki: Symphony No. 3 (Symphony of Sorrowful Songs) (2019) with Polish National Radio Symphony Orchestra

Other works
"Orang" on .O.rang's album Herd of Instinct (1994)
"Jalap" on .O.rang's album Fields and Waves (1996)
"Lonely Carousel" on Rodrigo Leão's album Cinema (2004)
"Strange Melody" on Jane Birkin's album Rendez-Vous (2004)
"Killing Time" on Joss Stone's Mind Body & Soul (2004)
"Love is a Stranger" on Fried's album Fried (2004)
"Mysteries" with Rustin Man from "The Russian Dolls" soundtrack (2005)
Soundtrack for Diane Bertrand's film "L'Annulaire" (unreleased, 2005)
"My Secret" on Jane Birkin's album Fictions (2006)
"Requiem for Anna" on Monsieur Gainsbourg Revisited - performed as Portishead (2006)
"Sing" with Annie Lennox from Songs of Mass Destruction (2007)
Soundtrack for Diane Bertrand's film Baby Blues (2008)
Soundtrack for Julie Taymor's film "The Tempest" - "Prospera's Coda" by Elliot Goldenthal (2010)
"GMO" on JJ Doom's Key to the Kuffs (2012)
"Black Sabbeth" with Gonga (2014)
Mandela Effect with Gonjasufi (2017)
"Mother I Sober" with Kendrick Lamar (2022)

References

External links

Beth Gibbons website

Portishead band website
Guardian: Portishead (02/2008)

1965 births
20th-century English women singers
20th-century English singers
English women guitarists
English guitarists
English songwriters
Living people
Musicians from Bristol
Musicians from Exeter
Portishead (band) members
Mezzo-sopranos
British trip hop musicians
English women in electronic music
21st-century English women singers
21st-century English singers
English folk singers
Alternative rock singers
Go! Beat artists